The Jordanian Permanent Representative to the United Nations in New York City is the representative of the government in Amman (Jordan) next the Headquarters of the United Nations.

List of representatives

.

References 

 
United Nations
Jordan